Polistes crinitus americanus is a subspecies of Polistes crinitus that lives on small Caribbean islands.

References

crinitus americanus